Mount Hutt rises to the west of the Canterbury Plains in the South Island of New Zealand, above the braided upper reaches of the Rakaia River, and 80 kilometres west of Christchurch. Its summit is 2190 metres above sea level.

The New Zealand Ministry for Culture and Heritage gives a translation of "place of the hill" for Ōpuke.

Ski field
The mountain is home to a commercial alpine ski area offering 3.65 square kilometres of skiable terrain and a vertical of 683 metres. The ski field is owned and operated by NZSki

It caters for a wide range of skier and snowboarder abilities, with two surface/conveyor lifts, a high-speed six seater chairlift, a high-speed eight seater chairlift and a fixed-grip three seater chairlift. The lift infrastructure provides access to a wide range of beginner, intermediate and advanced runs, access to large off-piste areas and several terrain parks. The most advanced runs on the mountain are through the rock formations at the top of the field known as "The Towers", and the South Face.

The snow season is from June to October. Mount Hutt prides itself on being the first ski field in the Southern Hemisphere to open at the beginning of each season. On 12 August 2010, winds of up to 200 km/h struck the ski area, resulting in its closure along with the access road, and stranding 1200 people on the mountain overnight, where they were accommodated in the ski-field's base buildings. The road was reopened the following day.

Since there is no accommodation on the mountain, most visitors stay in the nearby town of Methven, a 35-minute drive to the mountain. The larger town of Ashburton is 55 minutes away. The city of Christchurch is one hour 45 minutes drive away.

Mt Hutt is managed by NZSki along with Coronet Peak and The Remarkables in Queenstown. Mount Hutt was named by the Canterbury Association surveyor Joseph Thomas for John Hutt, an early member of the Association.

In 2020, the Zionist Federation of New Zealand lobbied the ski-field to remove a commemorative plaque to one of its founders, Willi Huber, a former member of the Waffen-SS. The Federation also lobbied for the renaming of a ski trail and alpine restaurant that were named after Huber. NZSki have renamed the ski trail and restaurant.

Fauna
During the summer months four species of Alpine grasshoppers can be found within the ski field boundary. They include Sigaus villosus which can be found along the ridgelines, Brachaspis nivalis which lives on the rocky scree, Sigaus australis and Paprides nitidus which both live in the alpine tussocklands.

Gallery

References

External links

The Mt Hutt ski area website
 The nzski.com website
 0800Snow Review on Mt Hutt
Mt Hutt Webcams and Weather Report
 

Hutt
Hutt